Psychicemotus is a 1965 album by Yusef Lateef.

Track listing
 "Psychicemotus" (Yusef Lateef) – 5:05
 "Bamboo Flute Blues" (Lateef) – 4:02
 "Semiocto" (Lateef) – 4:31
 "Why Do I Love You?" (Oscar Hammerstein II, Jerome Kern) – 6:32
 "First Gymnopédie" (Erik Satie) – 3:29
 "Medula Sonata" (Lateef) – 6:35
 "I'll Always Be in Love with You" (Bud Green, Harry Ruby, Sam H. Stept) – 4:42
 "Ain't Misbehavin'" (Brooks, Andy Razaf, Fats Waller) – 4:45

Personnel

Performance
 Yusef Lateef – flute, percussion, arranger, oboe, tenor saxophone, tambourine, chinese flutes, bamboo flute 
 Georges Arvanitas – piano
 Reggie Workman – double bass
 James Black – drums, percussion, indian bells

References

1965 albums
Yusef Lateef albums
Albums produced by Bob Thiele
Albums recorded at Van Gelder Studio
Impulse! Records albums